Saint Regina may refer to:
Saint Regina (martyr), 3rd century French martyr and saint of the Catholic Church
Diocese of Saint Regina, former name of the Roman Catholic Archdiocese of Regina, Saskatchewan, Canada